Khutaba is an Abkhaz surname. Notable people with the surname include:

Bagrat Khutaba (born 1982), Abkhaz wrestler and sports official
Rashid Khutaba (born 1951), Abkhaz wrestler and sports official, father of Bagrat

Abkhaz-language surnames